Entanglement may refer to:
 Quantum entanglement
 Orientation entanglement
 Entanglement (graph measure)
 Entanglement of polymer chains, see Reptation
 Wire entanglement
 in fishery: method by which fish are caught in fishing nets
 unintended entanglement of marine fish and mammals in ghost nets or similar: Plastic pollution#Entanglement
 as a proper noun:
 Entanglement (film)
 "Entanglement", a season one episode of Touch
 Entanglement (opera), a 2015 chamber opera by Charlotte Bray and the librettist Amy Rosenthal
 "Entanglement", a song by Charlotte Church from Four
 Entanglements, an album by Parenthetical Girls

See also
Entangled (disambiguation)